Eric Gibbs is an American attorney at Gibbs Law Group LLP in the United States. He is a member of the Board of Governors of the Consumer Attorneys of California. As a part of the American Association for Justice, he co-chairs the Consumer Privacy and Data Breach Litigation Group and the Lumber Liquidators Litigation Group, and serves as the secretary for the Qui Tam Litigation Group.

Early life and education
Eric Gibbs started his legal career at Lieff Cabraser, working his way from the mail room to paralegal. After deciding to become an attorney, Eric attended law school at Seattle University School of Law and graduated with his juris doctor degree in 1995. He passed the California bar examination and received his license to practice in the state of California.

He worked for two years at the Consumer Protection Division of the Washington Attorney General's Office, before joining his former colleague from Lieff Cabraser, Daniel Girard, as a named partner at Girard Gibbs LLP. After building his practice with his partner Daniel Girard for 20 years, Eric set out on his own, transitioning his practice to a new firm, Gibbs Law Group. Gibbs Law Group grew to include approximately 20 attorneys, a relatively large size for a plaintiffs' firm.

Career

Data Breach Practice

Eric won an MVP award in 2018 from Law360, a LexisNexis Company, for his work in litigating against Anthem Blue Cross Blue Shield over a data breach involving the personal information of approximately 80 million insurance customers. Law360 notes that Eric played a key role in negotiating a $115 million with Anthem, a record settlement in a data breach case. Eric noted that the Anthem medical data breach was a tricky case because data breach litigation was still in its infancy and there was not much precedent to draw upon. "With data breach cases in particular, a lot of what you’re doing is uncertain and untested. There’s not 20 years of data breach jurisprudence that one can draw on,” Eric said.

Eric first got involved in data breach cases, he says, "because we were seeing a number of district court opinions dismissing breach cases on standing grounds" and he believed the law was going in the wrong direction. As a result, Eric sought and was awarded Lead Counsel status in a case stemming from the 2013 Adobe data breach. His firm argued the standing issue to federal court judge Lucy Koh, the same judge who would later appoint Eric to a leadership position in the Anthem data breach litigation. Judge Koh sided with Eric and the plaintiffs he represented in the Adobe case, in an opinion on data-breach standing that has been cited dozens of times by courts across the country, and influenced at least three of the twelve federal appellate courts to adopt pro-standing positions in data breach cases. Eric said the Adobe decision "opened the door" for data breach cases across the country, and these cases are "incredibly important to the marketplace" and "to the people whose data was taken."

In 2019, Eric received a California Lawyer Magazine's Attorney of the Year (CLAY) award for is work in data breach and privacy litigation.

Eric was appointed by the court in the consolidated Equifax data breach lawsuit to help lead the litigation efforts. The Equifax breach compromised the personal information of as many as 145.5 million people. In 2019, Eric and his firm helped secure a ruling for consumers that they could pursue a nationwide claim for negligence and negligence per se against Equifax for failing to adequately secure their personal information.

Eric is also currently litigating data breach cases against Banner Health and Excellus BlueCross BlueShield in court-appointed leadership roles.

Privacy Practice

Eric worked on a privacy class action against Lenovo, in which his firm was appointed co-lead counsel. The lawsuit alleged that Lenovo violated federal hacking and wiretap laws by pre-installing spyware, made by Superfish, on its computers to track their owners' activities, without their consent. Eric's firm helped achieve a $8.3 million settlement with Lenovo and Superfish on behalf of consumers.

In the Vizio privacy litigation, concerning allegations that Vizio smart TVs spied on owners without their consent, the court appointed Eric co-lead counsel. Eric's firm helped secure an early victory by defeating Vizio's motion to dismiss the plaintiffs' Video Privacy Protection Act claim. Eric was then instrumental in negotiating a $17 million settlement with Vizio on behalf of smart TV owners. The settlement also required Vizio to delete all the viewing data it had collected without users' consent.

Mass Tort Practice

In the Risperdal litigation, the court appointed Eric to a leadership role to help lead the mass tort litigation against Johnson & Johnson over failing to disclose that its antipsychotic drug, Risperdal, could cause growth of breast tissue in men. The mass tort litigation efforts also included representing men and boys who developed male breast tissue from taking the antipsychotic drug Invega, manufactured by Janssen Pharmaceuticals. Eric and the litigation team helped uncover evidence that Johnson & Johnson knew as early as 2001 that taking Risperdal could cause breast development in men. The litigation proceeded to bellwether trials to give the parties a sense of the likely outcomes if all the thousands of cases are litigated to a verdict. In early trials, one plaintiff, who had used Risperdal since he was eight and developed breast tissue as a result, was awarded $2.5 million by the jury. In a 2016 bellwether, the jury awarded a record-setting $70 million to the family of a five-year-old boy who grew breast tissue due to Risperdal use. Eric and the litigation team are gearing up for additional bellwether trials against Johnson & Johnson.

Eric Gibbs served in a leadership role in the mass tort litigation against Takeda Pharmaceuticals concerning allegations that the diabetes drug Actos (Pioglitazone) caused bladder cancer. In 2015, Takeda reached a global settlement with the over 9,000 plaintiffs in the litigation, agreeing to pay them $2.4 billion.

Eric and his partners took on a leadership position doing legal briefing in the Yaz and Yasmin mass tort litigation, concerning allegations that the birth control pills manufactured by Bayer caused blood clots, deep vein thrombosis, and stroke. Bayer paid over $2 billion in settlements to individuals who experienced these side effects, without taking any cases to trial.

Eric served in a leadership position in the GranuFlo and Naturalyte litigation. Fresenius, a major player in the dialysis industry, made a dialysis cocktail that included its patented GranuFlo and Naturalyte drugs. Fresenius identified in an internal memo that the dialysis drugs caused elevated bicarbonate levels in patients, elevating the risk of heart attack and stroke by a factor of six, but Fresenius did not disclose this risk until a year later, when the FDA issued a Class I recall. In 2017, Fresenius agreed to pay $250 million into a settlement fund to pay patients who had heart attacks or strokes while using GranuFlo and NaturLyte.

Consumer Practice

Early in his career, Eric served as lead counsel in a class action lawsuit against Apple over iPod batteries dying too quickly. The lawsuit alleged that Apple had promised 8 to 10 hour battery life for early-generation iPods and that the batteries would last the "lifetime" of the iPod, but consumers reported battery performance degrading within 18 months of purchase. Eric negotiated a settlement with Apple that provided new iPods and cash to class members. Commenting on the settlement, Eric said, "At the heart of this settlement is the promise of a replacement iPod for people who bought the third-generation iPod." Consumers who bought first or second-generation iPods could receive a cash payment of $25 or a coupon for $50 in Apple store credit, which would pay 85% of the cost of purchasing an extended battery warranty from Apple.

Eric Gibbs has served as a court-appointed lead counsel, class counsel, and liaison counsel in numerous major class action lawsuits. As a partner at Girard Gibbs LLP, he litigated against General Motors regarding the organic antifreeze DEX-COOL, as it was linked to the degradation of engine sealability components.

Eric was part of the leadership team in the Chase check loan litigation, which alleged that Chase has issued favorable consumer loans during good economic times, and later jacked up the interests rates. Eric helped settle the case for $100 million. At the end, only one of plaintiffs' legal theories remained standing, prompting the judge to note that Eric and other plaintiffs' counsel “fought tooth and nail, down to the wire” to achieve “the best settlement that they could under the circumstances.” The Consumer Attorneys of California nominated Eric Gibbs as a finalist for the 2013 Consumer Attorney of the Year for his work representing plaintiffs against Chase Bank.

Additionally, Girard Gibbs LLP recently filed a class action suit against Volkswagen over its circumvention of federal emissions tests.

Gibbs Law Group LLP
In 2014, Eric Gibbs founded Gibbs Law Group, a national law firm representing consumers, employees, whistleblowers and investors is complex lawsuits.

Girard Gibbs LLP
Girard Gibbs LLP was founded in 1995. The firm represents clients in securities, antitrust, personal injury, consumer protection, whistleblower, and employment law litigation. On October 1, 2018, Girard Gibbs changed its name to Girard Sharp and Eric Gibbs continued his role as managing partner of Gibbs Law Group.

Current court-appointed leadership positions
 In re Adobe Systems, Inc. Privacy Litigation, No. 13-cv-05226-LHK 
 Velasco v. Chrysler Group LLC, No. 13-cv-08080-DDP-VBK
 Stedman v. Mazda Motor Corporation, No. 8:14-cv-01608-JVS
 In re Ford Fusion and C-MAX Fuel Economy Litigation, No. 13-MD-2450
 In re Hyundai and Kia Fuel Economy Litigation, MDL No. 2424, No. 13-m-02424
 In re JCCP 4775, Risperdal and Invega Product Liability Cases
 Yaeger v. Subaru of America, Inc., No 1:14-cv-04490

Honors and awards
 Top 30 Plaintiff Lawyers in California, 2016
 Consumer Protection MVP for 2016, Law360 
 Top 100 Northern California Super Lawyers, 2012-2013
 Northern California Super Lawyers, 2010-2015
 Consumer Attorneys of California 2013 Consumer Attorney of the Year Finalist
 Best Lawyers Guide for Mass Tort Litigation/ Class Actions, 2012-2016
 Martindale-Hubbell AV-Preeminent Rating for Highest Ethics and Legal Skills

References

Living people
Year of birth missing (living people)
Place of birth missing (living people)
Seattle University School of Law alumni
People from the San Francisco Bay Area
California lawyers